"Silver" is a single by Echo & the Bunnymen which was released on 13 April 1984. It was the second single to be released from their 1984 album Ocean Rain. It stayed on the UK Singles Chart for five weeks, reaching a peak of number 30. It also reached number 14 on the Irish Singles Chart.

The B-side to the 7" is "Angels and Devils". The 12" version of the single was extended by one minute and 50 seconds and called "Silver (Tidal Wave)" and the B-side is the 7" version and "Angels and Devils". The 7" and 12" versions of the title track were recorded at the Studio Des Dames in Paris and the Amazon Studio in Liverpool, while "Angels and Devils" was recorded at The Automat in San Francisco on 18 March 1984.

Track listings
All tracks written by Will Sergeant, Ian McCulloch, Les Pattinson and Pete de Freitas.

7" release (Korova KOW 34)
"Silver" – 3:19
"Angels and Devils" – 4:24

12" release (Korova KOW 34T)
"Silver (Tidal Wave)" – 5:09
"Silver" – 3:19
"Angels and Devils" – 4:24

Chart positions

Personnel

Musicians
Ian McCulloch – vocals, guitar
Will Sergeant – lead guitar
Les Pattinson – bass
Pete de Freitas – drums
Adam Peters – piano, cello

Production
The Bunnymen – producer, mixed by
Gil Norton – producer, engineer, mixed by
Henri Loustau – producer, engineer
David Frazer – engineer
Jean-Yves – assistant engineer
Adam Peters – orchestral arrangement

References

External links
Lyrics at MTV.com

1984 singles
Echo & the Bunnymen songs
Songs written by Ian McCulloch (singer)
Songs written by Will Sergeant
Songs written by Les Pattinson
Songs written by Pete de Freitas
1984 songs
Song recordings produced by Gil Norton